Jump is a surname. Notable people with the surname include:

 Edward Jump (1832–1883), artist and cartoonist in Paris and California
 Gordon Jump (1932–2003), American actor
 Harry Jump (1914–1989), American politician
 Jimmy Jump (born 1976), Spanish streaker
 Russell Jump (1895–2000), American politician
 Stewart Jump (born 1952), English footballer